Gerardo Octavio Solís Gómez (born November 19, 1957 in Guadalajara, Jalisco) is a Mexican politician, member of the National Action Party who has served as substitute Governor of Jalisco.

Biography 

Solís Gómez served is the cabinet of Francisco Javier Ramírez Acuña as Secretary General of Government.  The Congress of Jalisco designated him substitute Governor of Jalisco when Ramírez Acuña left that position to serve in the cabinet of Felipe Calderón.

Solís took office as Governor on November 21, 2006.

References 

1957 births
Living people
Governors of Jalisco
National Action Party (Mexico) politicians
Politicians from Guadalajara, Jalisco